Dudzele is a village and subdivision in the municipality of Bruges, Belgium.

See also
West Flanders

Sub-municipalities of Bruges
Populated places in West Flanders